Gokulotsavji Maharaj is a Hindustani classical musician, specializing in Khayal, Dhrupad Dhammar, Prabandh Gayaki and various other ancient indian musical styles. He is also a singer-cum-composer, writer, poet, and musicologist.

He composes music under the pen name MadhurPiya. He has created more than 5,000 compositions in Khayal, Dhrupad Dhammar, Prabandha Gayan, etc. in Sanskrit, Hindi, Braj Bhasha, Persian, Urdu. He belongs to the SamVeda(mother of Indian Music) and Krishna Yajurveda parampara[tradition].

He has received Padma Bhushan, Padma Shri by the Central Government of India. He has also received National Tansen Samman Award 7 December 2007, Dhrupad Ratna from Darbhanga Gharana of Dhrupad Virtuosos Pt Kshtipal Mallick Dhrupad Society. He is the top grade artist of All India Radio(Aakashwani) and DoorDarshan.

He has also created several new Raagas such as Bhaat Kalyan, AdhbhutRanjini, Hem Gaud, Madhur Malahar, Divya Gandhar, Khat Shringar, Prasanna Padaa, etc.

He sings in ancient talas, like Brahma Taal(28 beats per cycle) and Matta Taal(18 beats per cycle), Shikhar Taal, Lakshmi tala and others.

He has given interpretations and hidden meanings of syllables nom, tom, dere, na, tadani, etc., of dhrupad aalap and tarana, which were earlier considered to be meaningless and he states that these syllables derive their meaning, authority, creation and existence from vedic mantra beej-akshars.

Gokulotsavji Maharaj has created and founded his own distinct music style "Sarvang Sampurn Gayaki" consisting of a combination of various elements of classical vocal music as mentioned in sangeet shashtras.

Neeta Mathur(associate professor at Vivekanand College Delhi University) has authored a biographical book named "Shashtriya Sangeet ke Surya Acharya (Pt) Gokulotsavji Maharaj"[Sun of Classical Music  Acharya (Pt) Gokulotsavji Mahara] on Gokulotsavji Maharaj.

Gokulotsavji Maharaj has also served as the Member of Indian Council for Cultural Relations(ICCR), Trustee of Bharat Bhavan and Judge to the First Court of Harisingh Gour Vishwavidyalaya, Sagar.

Recordings - Music Albums

See also 

 Hindustani Classical Music
 Music of India
 Haveli Sangeet
 Sarvang Sampurn Gayaki
 Shastriya sangeet ke surya Acharya (Pt.) Gokulotsav ji Maharaj Part 1

References

Further reading 
 Shastriya Sangeet Ke Surya [biography]. Neeta Mathur. Radha Publication. Delhi. 2011.
 gokulotsavji.com
 goswamigokulutsavji.com
 sarvanggayki.com
 Sastriya Sangita ke Surya : Acharya (Pt) Gokulotsav Ji Maharaj book, Author Neeta Mathur, Publisher Radha Publications, New Delhi ISBN 9788174787769, OCLC 769743702 

Year of birth missing (living people)
Living people
20th-century Indian composers
20th-century Khyal singers
20th-century Indian male singers
20th-century Indian singers
Hindustani composers
Hindustani singers
Indian classical composers
Indian male classical musicians
Indian male composers
Recipients of the Padma Bhushan in arts
Recipients of the Padma Shri in arts